P. Belousov Central Park of Culture and Recreation (rus Центра́льный парк культу́ры и о́тдыха им. П. П. Белоу́сова) is the largest Park of Tula city, a natural monument of the regional value and the object of the national property.

History

Originally on the site of the park was the city dump. As the city was expanding and the presence of the nearby waste could affect the sanitary condition of the city. The park was established in 1893 when by the initiative Белоусов, Пётр Петрович (врач), who was the health officer of Tula city, the waste was covered with soil and on this place were planted the trees. Thus, the park appeared in southward outskirts of Tula city and had an area of 36 ha. Three years later after the park was established in 1886 Tula's gubernia newspaper "Vedomosti" wrote there was appeared park-like forest on an area of 35 acres. The Central Park was greatly expanded in 1950th when the city-owned land was being allocated an additional more than 100 ha for planting plants. A landscape design of the park has been changed over time. Thus the park of Belousov's time was completed by various trees with dominated the birch and admixtures of oak, linden, ash.

Present

The Central Park was opened on 36 ha of city-owned land and was expanded to its current size of 143 ha of them the forest occupies 97 ha, a cascade of three ponds covers 11 ha and the size of recreational area is about 35 ha. Among some 90 species of the trees and shrubs are growing within the Park there have been dominated by birch, ash tree, oak, pine, maple, basswood, though there are also some rare species such as phellodendron amurense, quercus rubra, pinus sibirica, salix alba, and others. The flora of the Park is characterized by big diversity the herbaceous plants that are represented by 200 species of grasses. Various birds and mammals live in the Central Park. There is a local zoo area that is inhabited many types of birds (including Cygnus cygnus, Cygnus atratus, peafowls, phasianus, parrots, and others). Also in the Park are roes, foxes, goats, and rabbits.

References

 Центральный парк культуры и отдыха имени П. П. Белоусова (Wikipedia)

External links
 Центральный парк культуры и отдыха им. П. П. Белоусова (official site)
 Belousov Central Park
 P. Belousov Central Park of Culture and Recreation

Tula, Russia
Parks in Russia
Tourist attractions in Tula Oblast